Thierry Pantel (born 6 July 1964) is a French former long-distance runner who competed in the 1992 Summer Olympics.

References

1964 births
Living people
Olympic athletes of France
Athletes (track and field) at the 1992 Summer Olympics
French male long-distance runners
Mediterranean Games gold medalists for France
Mediterranean Games medalists in athletics
Athletes (track and field) at the 1993 Mediterranean Games